Livadia (or) is a village and a former community in the former Paionia Province, Kilkis regional unit, Greece. Since the 2011 local government reform, it is part of the municipality Paionia, of which it is a municipal unit. The municipal unit has an area of 32.282 km2.  11 km northwest of Griva, 15 km northwest of Goumenissa. Its population in 2011 was 404. It includes two villages: Megala Livadia and Mikra Livadia (now uninhabited). The Aromanian language is still spoken in Livadia.

This historic community took part in various Greek revolutions, in particular the Macedonian Struggle in which many of inhabitants of Livadia participated, including:
Anastassios Bilis Koulinas
Nikolaos Nessios
Konstantinos Balas
Michael Balas
Michael Batsios
Dimitrios Bellis
Nikolaos Davelis
Michael Papanikolaou
Nikolaos Saramanis
Georgios Takiris
Athanassios Tikas
Aristides Tikas
Georgios Chatzivrettas
Michael Bellis
Georgios Bellis (Belles)
Stergios Naoum (Kapetan Naoum)

Some other inhabitants of the town fought against Greek bands in the Ottoman Empire during the early 20th century, an example being Mihali Handuri, an Aromanian armatole.

Another notable figure with origins from Livadia is the Aromanian linguist and philologist Nicolae Saramandu.

References

Populated places in Kilkis (regional unit)
Aromanian settlements in Greece